A quadrant roadway intersection adds an additional "quadrant roadway" between two legs of an intersection. This roadway adds two three-way intersections in addition to the original four-way intersection moving all left turns (in right-hand traffic countries) or right turns (in left-hand traffic countries) from the main intersection. The design is intended to improve traffic flow by reducing signal timing phases from four to two in the main intersection. The design is intended for intersections where large artery routes meet in an area of dense development and high pedestrian volume.

Proponents also point to a reduction in places where accidents could occur from vehicles potentially crossing paths as well as a low development cost compared to roundabouts or the more complex single-point urban interchange designs. Opponents point to the increase in points where accidents could occur with merging traffic as well as the non-traditional nature of the design which has the potential to confuse drivers. Opponents also rebut low cost claims pointing to right-of-way and construction costs of the quadrant road.

A related structure known as a jughandle accomplishes similar traffic movement from a more compact shape.

Double-quadrant intersections
Single-quadrant intersections (pictured above) feature a single quadrant road.

A double-quadrant intersection (or two-quadrant intersection) adds a second quadrant road placed opposite another.

Quadrant interchanges

An interchange variant of the quadrant roadway intersection links grade-separated roads, generally a faster road with denser traffic, to a less traveled, slower road, via the quadrant road. This design is referred to as a one-quadrant interchange or as a single-loop intersection. This type of junction is common in Germany, where it is called a "partial at-grade intersection". A so-called two-quadrant interchange also exists, which adds a second quadrant road (although the term "two-quadrant interchange" could be applied to any grade-separated junction in which there are ramps in two quadrants).

, in Tokyo, Japan, is also a one-quadrant interchange connecting the elevated Shibuya Route and the underground Central Circular Route of Shuto Expressway. With circular ramps built on the southwest quadrant of two expressways, the Ōhashi JCT was designed in a four-leveled manner.

References

Road junction types